The Coast 34 is a Canadian sailboat that was designed by Bruce Roberts and Grahame Shannon as a cruiser and first built in 1980.

The Coast 34 is a development of an earlier Roberts design for amateur construction.

The design was also sold as the Passage 34, Roberts 34, and the Westcoast 34.

Production
The design was possibly first built by Clearwater Marine and was later constructed by Cape Marine and Windward Marine in Canada, but it is now out of production.

Design
The Coast 34 is a recreational keelboat, built predominantly of fibreglass, with a foam core used in the hull above the waterline. It also has wooden trim. The design has a masthead sloop rig, or optional cutter rig, with aluminum spars, a spooned raked stem, a rounded bulbous transom, a skeg-mounted rudder controlled by a wheel and a fixed fin keel. It displaces  and carries  of ballast.

The design was available in a conventional cockpit version or with a pilothouse.

The sleeping accommodation includes a bow port side double berth and an aft, starboard side double berth under the cockpit. The saloon provides additional sleeping space and has three seats to starboard and a "U"-shaped dinette to port. The galley is on the port side at the foot of the companionway steps and includes a three burner gimbal-mounted propane-fuelled stove. The head is forward on the port side, just aft of the bow cabin and includes a shower with a grated drain. There are provisions for wood or diesel cabin heating. A navigation table is provided.

Ventilation includes three opening hatches above the bow berth, head and the passageway. The main saloon has ten opening ports and four Dorade vents.

The bow has a self-draining anchor-locker and dual anchor rollers. The cabin roof has self-tailing winches for the internally-mounted halyards. Genoa and staysail sheet tracks are provided and the mainsail has a cockpit-mounted mainsheet traveller.

See also
List of sailing boat types

Similar sailboats
Beneteau 331
Beneteau First Class 10
C&C 34
C&C 34/36
Catalina 34
Columbia 34
Columbia 34 Mark II
Creekmore 34
Crown 34
CS 34
Express 34
Hunter 34
San Juan 34
Sea Sprite 34
Sun Odyssey 349
Tartan 34 C
Tartan 34-2
Viking 34

References

Keelboats
1980s sailboat type designs
Sailing yachts
Sailboat type designs by Bruce Roberts-Godson
Sailboat type designs by Grahame Shannon
Sailboat types built by Clearwater Marine
Sailboat types built by Cape Marine
Sailboat types built by Windward Marine